Clemencia Eugenia Garrido Álvarez de la Rivera (born 14 May 1933) is a Chilean historian and politician who served as mayor Vina del Mar after being appointed by Augusto Pinochet's dictatorship.

Works

Articles
 “Inauguración monumento José Francisco Vergara”, con Jorge Salomó, Archivo Histórico de Viña del Mar, serie Acontecer Urbano, N.º 1, Año 1, 1996, 15 págs.
 “Viña del Mar, un recorrido por su historia”, con Jorge Salomó, Archivo Histórico de Viña del Mar, serie Extensión Educativa, N.º 1, Año 2, Viña del Mar, 1997, 28 págs.
 “Palacio Rioja, Fernando Rioja Medel, creador y empresario 1860-1922”, Ediciones El Ángel, Viña del Mar, 1998, 38 págs.
 “140 años de la Cámara de Comercio y Valparaíso”, con Piero Castagneto y Alessandro Monteverde, Editorial Trineo S.A., Santiago, 1998, 175 págs.
 “Lever, Murphy y Cía., historia de una empresa viñamarina 1883-1936”, con Piero Castagneto, Flavio Baumann y Carolina Miranda, Viña del Mar, 1998, inédita.
 “Valparaíso Histórico de Lukas”, Con Vicente Mesina, Editorial El Mercurio de Valparaíso, Valparaíso, 2004.

References

External Links
 PUCV Archive
 

1933 births
Living people
Chilean people
Chilean historians
Municipal councillors of Viña del Mar
Mayors of Viña del Mar
Pontifical Catholic University of Valparaíso alumni
Independent Democratic Union politicians
Women mayors of places in Chile